A list of films produced in the Soviet Union in 1929 (see 1929 in film).

1929

See also
 1929 in the Soviet Union

External links
 Soviet films of 1929 at the Internet Movie Database

1929
Soviet
Films